Bayankhutag (rich noble) is a sum (district) of Khentii Province in eastern Mongolia. In 2010, its population was 1,949.

References 

Districts of Khentii Province